Half-Opened Windows is an Armenian talk show hosted by presenter-producer Hrach Muradyan. Since 13 December 2010, it has been the longest running Armenian talk show. In 2011, it was named the best talk show of the year. It aims to address difficult social issues.

Controversies 
In 2016, the talk show had a gay guest, who received some hate speech during the show. He was specifically discriminated for being gay by lawyer Garik Galikyan and producer Sargis Mikayelyan. They were both criticized for their hate speech against LGBT people. Nikol Pashinyan, the current Armenian prime minister, during his campaign in 2018, noted that "In New Armenia, there should be no show as Half-Opened Windows."

References

External links

 

ATV (Armenia) original programming
Armenian-language television shows
Nonlinear narrative television series
Armenian television talk shows
2010s Armenian television series